Digambar Jain Mahasabha or Shri Bharatvarshiya Digamber Jain Mahasabha is the oldest organisation of lay Jains in India.

History
The Digambar Jain Mahasabha was founded in 1894 in Mathura, Uttar Pradesh. It is considered a traditionalist organisation. Its two main branches are Dharm Sanrakshini Mahasabha and Teerth Sanrakshini Mahasabha.

Awards 
Bhagwan Mahavir Ahimsa Puraskar
Bhagwan Mahavir Ahimsa Puraskar was started in 2019 with Abhinandan Varthaman becoming the first recipient of the prestigious award. This award carries a cash prize worth Rs. 2.51 Lakh as well.

Publications
 Jain Gazette, a weekly publication of Dharm Sanrakshini Mahasabha, has been published regularly for the last 103 years. It claims to be the oldest Jain periodical in the world.
 Jain Mahiladarsh: a weekly women's magazine published since 1922, founded by Pandita Chandabai of Arrah and Magan Bai of Mumbai.
Prachin Jain Tirth Jirnoddhar: A monthly devoted to Jain history and archaeology since 2003.

See also
 Mula Sangh
 Kashtha Sangh
 Chandabai
 Vishwa Jain Sangathan

References

External links
  Jain Gazettee website
  Prachin Jain Tirth Jirnoddhar website

Jain organisations
Religious organizations established in 1894
Jainism in India
Religious organisations based in India
Conservatism in India
Jainism in Uttar Pradesh
Organisations based in Uttar Pradesh
Organisations based in Maharashtra
1894 establishments in India